The 1955 Open Championship was the 84th Open Championship, played 6–8 July at the Old Course in St Andrews, Scotland. Peter Thomson won the second of three consecutive Open titles, two strokes ahead of runner-up John Fallon. Thomson won a total of five Claret Jugs, the last in 1965.

Qualifying took place on 4–5 July, Monday and Tuesday, with 18 holes on the Old Course and 18 holes on the New Course. The number of qualifiers was limited to a maximum of 100, and ties for 100th place did not qualify. On Monday, Frank Jowle scored 63 on the New Course, and after a 72 on the Old Course the next day he led the qualifiers at 135, a shot ahead of Laurie Ayton. The qualifying score was 148 and 94 players advanced to the first round on Wednesday.

Three shot 69 in the opening round on Wednesday; after the second round on Thursday, three shared the 36-hole lead at 139: Eric Brown, Dennis Smalldon, and Thomson, with Fallon a stroke back in fourth. The maximum number of players making the cut was set at fifty, and ties for 50th place were not included. Five Americans were in the field of 94, three professionals and two amateurs. All five made the cut, and the top U.S. finisher was Ed Furgol in a tie for 19th place. Byron Nelson, whose only previous appearance at The Open was a fifth-place finish in 1937, tied for 32nd. The two amateurs finished in the top thirty.

Previously the 17th hole (the "Road Hole") was a par 5; for this Open it became a par 4, which reduced the course par from 73 to 72.

The winner's share was increased from £750 to £1,000, while the others were unchanged, bringing the total purse to £3,750.

Past champions in the field

Round summaries

First round
Wednesday, 6 July 1955

Source:

Second round
Thursday, 7 July 1955

Source:
Amateurs: Bucher (+2), Conrad (+4), McHale (+4), Lawrie (+5), Carr (+9), Murray (+11), Orr (+13), Robertson (+15)

Third round
Friday, 8 July 1955 (morning)

Source:

Final round
Friday, 8 July 1955 (afternoon)

Source:
Amateurs: Conrad (+5), McHale (+7), Bucher (+23).

References

External links
St Andrews 1955 (Official site)

The Open Championship
Golf tournaments in Scotland
Open Championship
Open Championship
Open Championship